is a Japanese monthly men's fashion and lifestyle magazine based in Tokyo. Published by Shueisha, it is an offshoot of women's magazine Non-no.

History
Men's Non-no was started in 1986, and the first issue appeared in 1987. The magazine is headquartered in Tokyo and published monthly by Shueisha. Although the monthly is mostly read by young men and university students, its readers also include females. The magazine covers articles on lifestyle, music and football with a special reference to fashion. It has recurring models from different racial backgrounds. It also features young male celebrities. In 1999 the circulation of Men's Non-no was 370,000 copies.

Notable exclusive models

Former
Hiroshi Abe
Shosuke Tanihara
Kentaro Sakaguchi

References

External links
 

1986 establishments in Japan
Celebrity magazines
Fashion magazines published in Japan
Magazines established in 1986
Magazines published in Tokyo
Men's fashion magazines
Men's magazines published in Japan
Monthly magazines published in Japan
Shueisha magazines